Holargos B.C. (alternate spellings: Cholargos) is a Greek professional basketball club. The club is located in Cholargos, Athens, Greece. The club's full name is Athlitiki Enosi Holargou (Greek: Αθλητική Ένωση Χολαργού), which is abbreviated as (Α.Ε. Χολαργού), and which means Basketball Club Holargos. In 2016, the club was merged with Livadeia, and was thus promoted to the Greek 2nd Division. In 2019, the club merged with Kolossos. In 2020 Holargos BC men's team makes a restart and will play in the 2nd Division of ESKA Championship.

History
In 2009, Holargos appeared for the first time in the 4th-tier level of the Greek national championships, in the Greek C League. In 2012, the club was promoted to the 3rd-tier level Greek B League, and stayed there for 3 years.

In 2016, the club merged with Livadeia, in order to be able to participate in the 2nd-tier level Greek A2 League. During the 2016 summer transfer window, Holargos managed to make some very good transfers (for that level of competition), including Nikos Angelopoulos, Georgios Apostolidis, Georgios Tsiakos, Igor Milošević, and Kevin Bleeker, who became the first non-Greek player to sign with the team.

In 2018, Holargos BC got promoted to the top-tier level Greek Basket League for the first time in its history, after defeating Apollon Patras in the finals of the Greek A2 Basket League promotion playoffs. For their first year in the Greek Basket League, Holargos appointed Aris Lykogiannis as the team's head coach.

After a successful 2018–19 season, in which Holargos reached the Greek Basket League playoffs and ranked 8th in the final league standings, the future of the club in the first division came into question, due to an announcement which declared that Holargos would not be participating in the 2019–20 campaign because of financial problems, and was seeking to concede their registration in the league to another club. Eventually, the majority owner of the club sold the club's tax ID to Kolossos Rodou. Holargos decided not to play in any League in the 2019–20 season.

In June 2020, the Board of Directors of Holargos decided the restart of the men's team, which in the 2020-21 season will participate in the championship of ESKA 2nd Division.

Arena
Holargos plays its home games at the "Antonis Tritsis" Indoor Hall, which was opened in 1990. The arena originally had a seating capacity of 800, but it was increased to 1,240 for the club's debut in the top-tier level Greek Basket League's 2018–19 season.

Season by season

Roster
The team has not signed any players ahead of the new season. The club's first team matches will be played by the U-18 academy players.

Notable players

  Nikos Angelopoulos
  Grigoris Rallatos
  Georgios Apostolidis
  Panos Kalaitzakis
  Akis Kallinikidis
  Michalis Kamperidis
  Dimitrios Kompodietas
  Thomas Kottas
  Spyros Motsenigos
  Nikos Papanikolaou
  Sakis Skoulidas
  Alexis Spyridonidis
  Tasos Spyropoulos
  Angelos Tsamis
  Georgios Tsiakos
 / Vlado Janković
 / Igor Milošević
  Robert Gilchrist
  Teddy Okereafor
  Kevin Bleeker
  Danny Agbelese
  Rashad Bell
  Darrin Dorsey
  Toarlyn Fitzpatrick
  Javontae Hawkins
  Jermaine Love
  Gary Talton

Head coaches

References

External links
Official Website 
Eurobasket.com Team Page

1982 establishments in Greece
Basketball teams established in 1982